Goitrin is a sulfur-containing oxazolidine, a cyclic thiocarbamate, that reduces the production of thyroid hormones such as thyroxine. It is found in cruciferous vegetables such as cabbage, brussels sprouts and rapeseed oil, and is formed by the hydrolysis of a glucosinolate: progoitrin or 2-hydroxy-3-butenyl glucosinolate. The unstable isothiocyanate (2-hydroxy-3-butenyl isothiocyanate) derived from the latter glucosinolate spontaneously cyclizes to goitrin, because the hydroxy group is situated in proximity to the isothiocyanate group (allowing a five-membered ring to be formed). Hence, the oxygen in the molecule stems from the hydroxy group of the original unstable isothiocyanate. Plants containing this specific glucosinolate (or glucosinolates such as glucobrassicin and sinalbin which liberate thiocyanate ion) have goitrogenic potential due to the goitrin and thiocyanate they contain. However, they do not seem to alter thyroid function in humans at realistic amounts in the diet.

See also 
Goitrogen

References 

Oxazolidines
Thiocarbamates
Vinyl compounds